Oleg Andreyevich Morozov (17 March 1937 – 1 April 2006) was a Soviet association football player.

International career
Morozov played his only game for the Soviet national football team on 30 August 1958 in a friendly match against Czechoslovakia.

External links
 Profile

1937 births
2006 deaths
Soviet footballers
Soviet Union international footballers
Russian footballers
FC Zenit Saint Petersburg players
Association football forwards
FC Dynamo Saint Petersburg players